James Dale Williams (born October 23, 1935) was a vice admiral in the United States Navy. He is a former commander of the United States Sixth Fleet (from August 1988 – November 1990), Commander of NATO Striking Force in Southern Europe, Commander of the Navy Recruiting Command, and Deputy Chief of Naval Operations for Naval Warfare. He is a 1958 graduate of the United States Naval Academy.

References

1935 births
Living people
People from Lumberton, North Carolina
United States Naval Academy alumni
United States Navy admirals